"Dance with Somebody" is a song by the alternative rock band Mando Diao. It was released in January 2009 as the lead single from their album, Give Me Fire. A segment of the song was the theme song for the twelfth season of Dancing With The Stars.

Music video
The music video was directed by Matt Wignall and Vern Moen.

Charts

Weekly charts

Year-end charts

Covers
In 2014, the song was covered by German heavy metal band Iron Savior as a surprise track on their album Rise of the Hero. Vocalist/guitarist Piet Sielck explained that the band originally intended the song to be a bonus track for their limited edition release. He addressed why it never came to be:

"we simply liked it too much and finally decided to make it a regular album track."

References

External links

2009 singles
Mando Diao songs
Songs written by Björn Dixgård
Songs written by Gustaf Norén
2008 songs
EMI Records singles
Number-one singles in Austria